The 1992 Atlanta Braves season was the 27th in Atlanta and the 122nd overall. It involved the Braves finishing first in the National League West with a record of 98 wins and 64 losses, clinching their second straight division title.

In the National League Championship Series, the Braves defeated the Pittsburgh Pirates in seven games. In the World Series, Atlanta faced the Toronto Blue Jays, who were making their first appearance in the World Series. However, the Blue Jays won in six games, becoming the first non-U.S.-based team to win a World Series.

Offseason
November 20, 1991: Randy St. Claire was released by the Atlanta Braves.
December 10, 1991: Rico Rossy was traded by the Atlanta Braves to the Kansas City Royals for Bobby Moore.
December 12, 1991: Otis Nixon was signed as a free agent with the Atlanta Braves.
January 8, 1992: Steve Lyons signed as a free agent with the Atlanta Braves.

Regular season

Opening Day starters
 Tom Glavine, pitcher
 Rafael Belliard, shortstop
 Jeff Blauser, second base
 Sid Bream, first base
 Ron Gant, outfield
 David Justice, outfield
 Greg Olson, catcher
 Terry Pendleton, third base
 Deion Sanders, outfield

Season standings

Record vs. opponents

Notable transactions
April 30, 1992: Steve Lyons was released by the Atlanta Braves.
July 17, 1992: Randall Simon was signed by the Atlanta Braves as an amateur free agent.
July 21, 1992: Mark Davis was traded by the Kansas City Royals to the Atlanta Braves for Juan Berenguer.
August 30, 1992: Jeff Reardon was traded by the Boston Red Sox to the Atlanta Braves for Nate Minchey and Sean Ross (minors).

Roster

Game log 

|- bgcolor="#bbbfffbbb;"
| 1 || April 7 || @ Astros || 2–0 || Glavine (1-0) || Harnisch (0-1) || || 25,318 || 1-0
|- bgcolor="#bbbfffbbb;"
| 2 || April 8 || @ Astros || 3–1 || Smoltz (1-0) || Kile (0-1) || Peña (1) || 10,014 || 2-0
|- bgcolor="#fffbbbbbb;"
| 3 || April 9 || Giants || 4–11 || Heredia (1-0) || Avery (0-1) || || 43,622 || 2-1
|- bgcolor="#bbbfffbbb;"
| 4 || April 10 || Giants || 5–3 || Leibrandt (1-0) || Burba (0-1) || Stanton (1) || 37,577 || 3-1
|- bgcolor="#fffbbbbbb;"
| 5 || April 11 || Giants || 0–3 || Swift (2-0) || Bielecki (0-1) || || 44,550 || 3-2
|- bgcolor="#bbbfffbbb;"
| 6 || April 12 || Giants || 6–2 || Glavine (2-0) || Downs (0-2) || || 43,055 || 4-2
|- bgcolor="#fffbbbbbb;"
| 7 || April 13 || @ Reds || 4–5 || Belcher (1-1) || Smoltz (1-1) || Charlton (4) || 23,048 || 4-3
|- bgcolor="#fffbbbbbb;"
| 8 || April 14 || @ Reds || 4–5 || Bankhead (1-0) || Freeman (0-1) || || 19,466 || 4-4
|- bgcolor="#fffbbbbbb;"
| 9 || April 15 || @ Reds || 1–3 || Hammond (2-0) || Leibrandt (1-1) || Charlton (5) || 22,730 || 4-5
|- bgcolor="#bbbfffbbb;"
| 10 || April 16 || @ Dodgers || 3–0 || Bielecki (1-1) || Gross (0-1) || || 40,089 || 5-5
|- bgcolor="#fffbbbbbb;"
| 11 || April 17 || @ Dodgers || 5–7 || McDowell (1-2) || Peña (0-1) || || 47,771 || 5-6
|- bgcolor="#fffbbbbbb;"
| 12 || April 18 || @ Dodgers || 3–7 || McDowell (2-2) || Stanton (0-1) || || 46,851 || 5-7
|- bgcolor="#fffbbbbbb;"
| 13 || April 19 || @ Dodgers || 2–4 || Candiotti (3-0) || Avery (0-2) || || 37,145 || 5-8
|- bgcolor="#bbbfffbbb;"
| 14 || April 20 || @ Padres || 10–4 || Freeman (1-1) || Lefferts (1-2) || || 20,002 || 6-8
|- bgcolor="#fffbbbbbb;"
| 15 || April 21 || @ Padres || 2–4 || Rodriguez (1-1) || Bielecki (1-2) || Myers (4) || 26,468 || 6-9
|- bgcolor="#fffbbbbbb;"
| 16 || April 22 || @ Padres || 4–9 || Hurst (1-1) || Glavine (2-1) || || 18,581 || 6-10
|- bgcolor="#fffbbbbbb;"
| 17 || April 24 || Astros || 2–4 || Kile (2-1) || Smoltz (1-2) || D. Jones (6) || 40,666 || 6-11
|- bgcolor="#bbbfffbbb;"
| 18 || April 25 || Astros || 2–0 || Avery (1-2) || Portugal (2-1) || || 42,709 || 7-11
|- bgcolor="#bbbfffbbb;"
| 19 || April 26 || Astros || 3–2 || Freeman (2-1) || Harnisch (1-3) || Peña (2) || 37,137 || 8-11
|- bgcolor="#bbbfffbbb;"
| 20 || April 27 || Cubs || 5–0 || Glavine (3-1) || Boskie (3-1) || || 25,932 || 9-11
|- bgcolor="#bbbfffbbb;"
| 21 || April 28 || Cubs || 1–0 || Leibrandt (2-1) || Castillo (0-2) || Peña (3) || 28,765 || 10-11
|- bgcolor="#bbbfffbbb;"
| 22 || April 29 || Cubs || 8–0 || Smoltz (2-2) || Jackson (0-4) || || 33,144 || 11-11
|-

|- bgcolor="#fffbbbbbb;"
| 23 || May 1 || Mets || 7–8 || Burke (1-0) || Berenguer (0-1) || Franco (5) || 31,637 || 11-12
|- bgcolor="#bbbfffbbb;"
| 24 || May 2 || Mets || 3–0 || Glavine (4-1) || Gooden (2-2) || || 38,115 || 12-12
|- bgcolor="#fffbbbbbb;"
| 25 || May 3 || Mets || 0–7 || Cone (3-1) || Leibrandt (2-2) || || 41,282 || 12-13
|- bgcolor="#bbbfffbbb;"
| 26 || May 4 || @ Cubs || 6–1 || Smoltz (3-2) || Castillo (0-3) || || 22,836 || 13-13
|- bgcolor="#fffbbbbbb;"
| 27 || May 5 || @ Cubs || 3–4 (10) || McElroy (2-0) || Peña (0-2) || || 14,408 || 13-14
|- bgcolor="#fffbbbbbb;"
| 28 || May 6 || @ Pirates || 3–4 (16) || Patterson (2-0) || Rivera (0-1) || || 18,686 || 13-15
|- bgcolor="#bbbfffbbb;"
| 29 || May 7 || @ Pirates || 4–2 || Glavine (5-1) || Neagle (1-1) || Stanton (2) || 11,689 || 14-15
|- bgcolor="#bbbfffbbb;"
| 30 || May 8 || @ Cardinals || 2–1 || Leibrandt (3-2) || Tewksbury (3-1) || Freeman (1) || 45,110 || 15-15
|- bgcolor="#fffbbbbbb;"
| 31 || May 9 || @ Cardinals || 11–12 || Pérez (4-0) || Freeman (2-2) || Smith (10) || 40,417 || 15-16
|- bgcolor="#fffbbbbbb;"
| 32 || May 10 || @ Cardinals || 5–6 || Agosto (2-2) || Peña (0-3) || || 28,491 || 15-17
|- bgcolor="#fffbbbbbb;"
| 33 || May 11 || @ Cardinals || 3–8 || DeLeón (2-2) || Avery (1-3) || || 26,005 || 15-18
|- bgcolor="#bbbfffbbb;"
| 34 || May 12 || Pirates || 4–2 || Glavine (6-1) || Tomlin (4-2) || Freeman (2) || 38,949 || 16-18
|- bgcolor="#fffbbbbbb;"
| 35 || May 13 || Pirates || 10–11 || Belinda (2-0) || Peña (0-4) || || 24,872 || 16-19
|- bgcolor="#fffbbbbbb;"ñ
| 36 || May 14 || Pirates || 3–4 || Palacios (2-0) || Smoltz (3-3) || Mason (4) || 32,303 || 16-20
|- bgcolor="#bbbfffbbb;"
| 37 || May 15 || Expos || 4–2 || Mercker (1-0) || Nabholz (2-3) || Stanton (3) || 37,551 || 17-20
|- bgcolor="#fffbbbbbb;"
| 38 || May 16 || Expos || 1–7 || Martínez (3-4) || Avery (1-4) || Rojas (4) || 40,504 || 17-21
|- bgcolor="#fffbbbbbb;"
| 39 || May 17 || Expos || 4–5 || Hill (4-2) || Glavine (6-2) || Wetteland (6) || 41,480 || 17-22
|- bgcolor="#bbbfffbbb;"
| 40 || May 18 || Cardinals || 5–1 || Leibrandt (4-2) || Osborne (4-2) || || 23,546 || 18-22
|- bgcolor="#fffbbbbbb;"
| 41 || May 19 || Cardinals || 2–7 || Tewksbury (5-1) || Smoltz (3-4) || || 26,012 || 18-23
|- bgcolor="#bbbfffbbb;"
| 42 || May 20 || Cardinals || 6–3 || Avery (2-4) || Cormier (0-4) || || 22,610 || 19-23
|- bgcolor="#fffbbbbbb;"
| 43 || May 22 || @ Expos || 1–7 || Martínez (3-4) || Glavine (6-3) || || 20,313 || 19-24
|- bgcolor="#fffbbbbbb;"
| 44 || May 23 || @ Expos || 6–7 || Fassero (2-2) || Stanton (0-2) || Wetteland (7) || 15,918 || 19-25
|- bgcolor="#bbbfffbbb;"
| 45 || May 24 || @ Expos || 2–1 || Smoltz (4-4) || Gardner (3-3) || || 27,682 || 20-25
|- bgcolor="#fffbbbbbb;"
| 46 || May 25 || @ Phillies || 1–4 || Mulholland (5-3) || Avery (2-5) || Williams (7) || 18,343 || 20-26
|- bgcolor="#fffbbbbbb;"
| 47 || May 26 || @ Phillies || 2–5 || Robinson (1-0) || Bielecki (1-3) || Williams (8) || 11,295 || 20-27
|- bgcolor="#bbbfffbbb;"
| 48 || May 27 || @ Phillies || 9–3 || Glavine (7-3) || Brantley (2-3) || || 23,695 || 21-27
|- bgcolor="#bbbfffbbb;"
| 49 || May 29 || @ Mets || 5–1 || Smoltz (5-4) || Gooden (4-5) || || 31,866 || 22-27
|- bgcolor="#bbbfffbbb;"
| 50 || May 30 || @ Mets || 6–1 || Avery (3-5) || Cone (5-3) || || 46,261 || 23-27
|-

|- bgcolor="#bbbfffbbb;"
| 51 || June 1 || Phillies || 7–6 || Glavine (8-3) || Brantley (2-4) || Wohlers (1) || 25,647 || 24-27
|- bgcolor="#bbbfffbbb;"
| 52 || June 2 || Phillies || 5–3 || Stanton (1-2) || Williams (2-2) || || 27,855 || 25-27
|- bgcolor="#fffbbbbbb;"
| 53 || June 3 || Phillies || 1–4 || Schilling (4-3) || Smoltz (5-5) || Williams (9) || 19,357 || 25-28
|- bgcolor="#bbbfffbbb;"
| 54 || June 5 || @ Padres || 3–2 || Berenguer (1-1) || Lefferts (6-4) || Wohlers (2) || 21,781 || 26-28
|- bgcolor="#bbbfffbbb;"
| 55 || June 6 || @ Padres || 5–1 || Glavine (9-3) || Benes (5-5) || || 54,046 || 27-28
|- bgcolor="#bbbfffbbb;"
| 56 || June 7 || @ Padres || 9–4 || Smoltz (6-5) || Seminara (0-1) || || 18,924 || 28-28
|- bgcolor="#bbbfffbbb;"
| 57 || June 8 || @ Dodgers || 4–2 || Leibrandt (5-2) || Martínez (3-3) || Berenguer (1) || 29,799 || 29-28
|- bgcolor="#fffbbbbbb;"
| 58 || June 9 || @ Dodgers || 2–3 || Hershiser (6-3) || Stanton (1-3) || McDowell (9) || 33,387 || 29-29
|- bgcolor="#bbbfffbbb;"
| 59 || June 10 || @ Dodgers || 2–1 || Avery (4-5) || Gross (3-6) || Stanton (4) || 28,241 || 30-29
|- bgcolor="#bbbfffbbb;"
| 60 || June 12 || Padres || 6–4 || Berenguer (2-1) || Maddux (0-1) || Stanton (5) || 39,884 || 31-29
|- bgcolor="#bbbfffbbb;"
| 61 || June 13 || Padres || 4–2 || Smoltz (7-5) || Seminara (0-2) || || 38,149 || 32-29
|- bgcolor="#bbbfffbbb;"
| 62 || June 14 || Padres || 4–2 || Leibrandt (6-2) || Hurst (6-5) || Wohlers (3) || 40,790 || 33-29
|- bgcolor="#bbbfffbbb;"
| 63 || June 15 || Dodgers || 2–0 || Avery (5-5) || Hershiser (6-4) || || 43,239 || 34-29
|- bgcolor="#bbbfffbbb;"
| 64 || June 16 || Dodgers || 9–8 || Berenguer (3-1) || Candelaria (0-1) || || 42,523 || 35-29
|- bgcolor="#bbbfffbbb;"
| 65 || June 17 || Dodgers || 4–3 || Glavine (10-3) || Ojeda (3-4) || || 40,957 || 36-29
|- bgcolor="#fffbbbbbb;"
| 66 || June 18 || Reds || 5–7 (10) || Bankhead (8-1) || Stanton (1-4) || Charlton (16) || 47,896 || 36-30
|- bgcolor="#bbbfffbbb;"
| 67 || June 19 || Reds || 3–2 (10) || Mercker (2-0) || Henry (1-2) || || 43,042 || 37-30
|- bgcolor="#bbbfffbbb;"
| 68 || June 20 || Reds || 2–1 || Avery (6-5) || Browning (5-5) || Mercker (1) || 44,636 || 38-30
|- bgcolor="#bbbfffbbb;"
| 69 || June 21 || Reds || 2–0 || Bielecki (2-3) || Rijo (3-6) || Mercker (2) || 42,831 || 39-30
|- bgcolor="#bbbfffbbb;"
| 70 || June 23 || Giants || 7–0 || Glavine (11-3) || Burkett (5-4) || || 39,890 || 40-30
|- bgcolor="#bbbfffbbb;"
| 71 || June 24 || Giants || 5–0 || Smoltz (8-5) || Wilson (5-7) || || 39,016 || 41-30
|- bgcolor="#fffbbbbbb;"
| 72 || June 26 || @ Reds || 4–7 || Browning (6-5) || Avery (6-6) || || 44,431 || 41-31
|- bgcolor="#fffbbbbbb;"
| 73 || June 27 || @ Reds || 3–12 || Rijo (4-6) || Leibrandt (6-3) || || 43,883 || 41-32
|- bgcolor="#fffbbbbbb;"
| 74 || June 28 || @ Reds || 5–6 || Charlton (3-0) || Wohlers (0-1) || || 37,581 || 41-33
|- bgcolor="#bbbfffbbb;"
| 75 || June 30 || @ Giants || 4–3 || Smoltz (9-5) || Wilson (5-8) || || 16,299 || 42-33 
|-

|- bgcolor="#fffbbbbbb;"
| 76 || July 1 || @ Giants || 1–2 || Black (5-2) || Avery (6-7) || Beck (5) || 17,966 || 42-34
|- bgcolor="#bbbfffbbb;"
| 77 || July 3 || Cubs || 3–0 || Glavine (12-3) || Boskie (5-5) || || 43,803 || 43-34
|- bgcolor="#bbbfffbbb;"
| 78 || July 4 || Cubs || 4–2 || Leibrandt (7-3) || Jackson (4-9) || Mercker (3) || 42,106 || 44-34
|- bgcolor="#fffbbbbbb;"
| 79 || July 5 || Cubs || 0–8 || Maddux (10-7) || Smoltz (9-6) || || 42,545 || 44-35
|- bgcolor="#fffbbbbbb;"
| 80 || July 6 || Mets || 1–3 || Cone (8-4) || Freeman (2-3) || Guetterman (1) || 39,444 || 44-36
|- bgcolor="#fffbbbbbb;"
| 81 || July 7 || Mets || 4–5 || Fernandez (7-7) || Bielecki (2-4) || Young (2) || 39,490 || 44-37
|- bgcolor="#bbbfffbbb;"
| 82 || July 8 || Mets || 2–1 || Glavine (13-3) || Whitehurst (1-4) || Peña (4) || 37,721 || 45-37
|- bgcolor="#bbbfffbbb;"
| 83 || July 9 || @ Cubs || 2–0 (12) || Stanton (2-4) || Bullinger (0-2) || Peña (5) || 32,816 || 46-37
|- bgcolor="#bbbfffbbb;"
| 84 || July 10 || @ Cubs || 4–0 || Smoltz (10-6) || Maddux (10-8) || || 35,067 || 47-37
|- bgcolor="#bbbfffbbb;"
| 85 || July 11 || @ Cubs || 3–1 || Avery (7-7) || Scanlan (2-5) || Peña (6) || 36,541 || 48-37
|- bgcolor="#bbbfffbbb;"
| 86 || July 12 || @ Cubs || 7–4 (10) || Mercker (3-0) || Assenmacher (2-2) || Peña (7) || 28,272 || 49-37
|- bgcolor="#bbbfffbbb;"
| 87 || July 16 || @ Astros || 4–2 || Avery (8-7) || Williams (3-1) || Peña (8) || 19,383 || 50-37
|- bgcolor="#bbbfffbbb;"
| 88 || July 17 || @ Astros || 5–0 || Smoltz (11-6) || Harnisch (3-8) || || 24,691 || 51-37
|- bgcolor="#bbbfffbbb;"
| 89 || July 18 || @ Astros || 3–0 || Glavine (14-3) || J. Jones (4-4) || Peña (9) || 24,086 || 52-37
|- bgcolor="#bbbfffbbb;"
| 90 || July 19 || @ Astros || 3–2 (10) || Freeman (3-3) || Hernandez (5-1) || Peña (10) || 27,270 || 53-37
|- bgcolor="#bbbfffbbb;"
| 91 || July 21 || @ Cardinals || 9–7 (12) || Peña (1-4) || Perez (6-2) || || 39,561 || 54-37
|- bgcolor="#bbbfffbbb;"
| 92 || July 22 || @ Cardinals || 2–0 || Smoltz (12-6) || Olivares (6-5) || Mercker (4) || 34,605 || 55-37
|- bgcolor="#bbbfffbbb;"
| 93 || July 24 || Pirates || 4–3 || Glavine (15-3) || Walk (3-4) || Peña (11) || 44,965 || 56-37
|- bgcolor="#bbbfffbbb;"
| 94 || July 25 || Pirates || 1–0 || Leibrandt (8-3) || Jackson (4-10) || Mercker (5) || 44,567 || 57-37
|- bgcolor="#fffbbbbbb;"
| 95 || July 26 || Pirates || 4–5 || Belinda (5-2) || Wohlers (0-2) || || 43,714 || 57-38
|- bgcolor="#fffbbbbbb;"
| 96 || July 27 || Astros || 1–5 (11) || D. Jones (8-7) || Peña (1-5) || || 38,729 || 57-39
|- bgcolor="#fffbbbbbb;"
| 97 || July 28 || Astros || 5–7 || Harnisch (4-8) || Freeman (3-4) || D. Jones (21) || 40,457 || 57-40
|- bgcolor="#bbbfffbbb;"
| 98 || July 29 || Astros || 5–3 || Glavine (16-3) || Blair (2-6) || Peña (12) || 39,076 || 58-40
|- bgcolor="#fffbbbbbb;"
| 99 || July 30 || @ Giants || 0–5 || Burkett (7-6) || Leibrandt (8-4) || || 14,313 || 58-41
|- bgcolor="#fffbbbbbb;"
| 100 || July 31 || @ Giants || 3–4 || Jackson (5-3) || Mercker (3-1) || || 21,025 || 58-42
|-

|- bgcolor="#bbbfffbbb;"
| 101 || August 1 || @ Giants || 5–3 || Smoltz (13-6) || Black (9-4) || || 31,986 || 59-42
|- bgcolor="#bbbfffbbb;"
| 102 || August 2 || @ Giants || 3–0 || P. Smith (1-0) || Swift (8-3) || Peña (13) || -- || 60-42
|- bgcolor="#bbbfffbbb;"
| 103 || August 2 || @ Giants || 8–5 || Reynoso (1-0) || Hickerson (4-2) || Freeman (3) || 36,302 || 61-42
|- bgcolor="#bbbfffbbb;"
| 104 || August 4 || Reds || 7–5 || Freeman (4-4) || Charlton (3-1) || || 45,155 || 62-42
|- bgcolor="#bbbfffbbb;"
| 105 || August 5 || Reds || 5–1 || Avery (9-7) || Belcher (9-10) || || 44,480 || 63-42
|- bgcolor="#bbbfffbbb;"
| 106 || August 6 || Reds || 5–3 || Smoltz (14-6) || Swindell (10-5) || || 44,768 || 64-42
|- bgcolor="#bbbfffbbb;"
| 107 || August 7 || Dodgers || 6–2 || Leibrandt (9-4) || Gross (5-11) || || 43,822 || 65=42
|- bgcolor="#bbbfffbbb;"
| 108 || August 8 || Dodgers || 12–2 || P. Smith (2-0) || Candiotti (9-10) || || 43,116 || 66-42
|- bgcolor="#bbbfffbbb;"
| 109 || August 9 || Dodgers || 10–3 || Glavine (17-3) || Hershiser (8-10) || || 43,659 || 67-42
|- bgcolor="#fffbbbbbb;"
| 110 || August 10 || Dodgers || 3–5 || Martínez (8-8) || Avery (9-8) || Gott (5) || 43,368 || 67-43
|- bgcolor="#fffbbbbbb;"
| 111 || August 11 || Padres || 4–8 || Hurst (12-6) || Smoltz (14-7) || Maddux (5) || 43,927 || 67-44
|- bgcolor="#bbbfffbbb;"
| 112 || August 13 || Padres || 4–3 || Davis (1-0) || Andersen (1-1) || || 38,319 || 68-44
|- bgcolor="#bbbfffbbb;"
| 113 || August 14 || @ Pirates || 15–0 || Glavine (18-3) || Smith (8-8) || || 38,595 || 69-44
|- bgcolor="#bbbfffbbb;"
| 114 || August 15 || @ Pirates || 7–5 || Avery (10-8) || Jackson (5-11) || Peña (14) || 38,808 || 70-44
|- bgcolor="#fffbbbbbb;"
| 115 || August 16 || @ Pirates || 2–4 || Wakefield (3-0) || Smoltz (14-8) || || 35,199 || 70-45
|- bgcolor="#bbbfffbbb;"
| 116 || August 17 || @ Pirates || 5–4 (10) || Freeman (5-4) || Patterson (5-2) || Peña (15) || 38,062 || 71-45
|- bgcolor="#bbbfffbbb;"
| 117 || August 18 || @ Expos || 5–1 || Leibrandt (10-4) || Hill (13-6) || || 32,920 || 72-45
|- bgcolor="#bbbfffbbb;"
| 118 || August 19 || @ Expos || 4–2 || Glavine (19-3) || Nabholz (8-9) || Stanton (6) || 27,235 || 73-45
|- bgcolor="#fffbbbbbb;"
| 119 || August 20 || @ Expos || 2–3 || Fassero (5-5) || Peña (1-6) || || 23,896 || 73-46
|- bgcolor="#fffbbbbbb;"
| 120 || August 21 || Cardinals || 2–5 (10) || Pérez (7-2) || Mercker (3-2) || Smith (32) || 33,835 || 73-47
|- bgcolor="#bbbfffbbb;"
| 121 || August 22 || Cardinals || 3–2 || P. Smith (3-0) || Clark (2-7) || || 45,175 || 74-47
|- bgcolor="#fffbbbbbb;"
| 122 || August 23 || Cardinals || 3–8 || Olivares (7-8) || Leibrandt (10-5) || || 40,200 || 74-48
|- bgcolor="#fffbbbbbb;"
| 123 || August 25 || Expos || 0–6 || Nabholz (9-9) || Glavine (19-4) || || 38,455 || 74-49
|- bgcolor="#fffbbbbbb;"
| 124 || August 26 || Expos || 4–5 || Martínez (14-10) || Avery (10-9) || Wetteland (29) || 36,275 || 74-50
|- bgcolor="#fffbbbbbb;"
| 125 || August 28 || @ Phillies || 3–7 || Mulholland (12-8) || Smoltz (14-9) || || 22,267 || 74-51
|- bgcolor="#bbbfffbbb;"
| 126 || August 29 || @ Phillies || 7–6 || Leibrandt (11-5) || Schilling (11-9) || Mercker (6) || 27,760 || 75-51
|- bgcolor="#fffbbbbbb;"
| 127 || August 30 || @ Phillies || 2–10 || Rivera (4-3) || Glavine (19-5) || || 32,084 || 75-52
|- bgcolor="#bbbfffbbb;"
| 128 || August 31 || @ Mets || 8–6 (14) || Wohlers (1-2) || Guetterman (2-3) || Stanton (7) || -- || 76-52
|- bgcolor="#bbbfffbbb;"
| 129 || August 31 || @ Mets || 7–5 || P. Smith (4-0) || Birkbeck (0-1) || Reardon (1) || 24,392 || 77-52
|-

|- bgcolor="#bbbfffbbb;"
| 130 || September 1 || @ Mets || 4–1 || Nied (1-0) || Whitehurst (2-8) || Reardon (2) || 21,539 || 78-52
|- bgcolor="#fffbbbbbb;"
| 131 || September 2 || @ Mets || 5–6 || Schourek (4-6) || Smoltz (14-10) || Young (12) || 17,962 || 78-53
|- bgcolor="#fffbbbbbb;"
| 132 || September 3 || Expos || 2–11 || Barnes (5-5) || Leibrandt (11-6) || Bottenfield (1) || 27,824 || 78-54
|- bgcolor="#fffbbbbbb;"
| 133 || September 4 || Phillies || 1–2 || Schilling (12-9) || Glavine (19-6) || Williams (23) || 40,768 || 78-55
|- bgcolor="#bbbfffbbb;"
| 134 || September 5 || Phillies || 6–5 || Reardon (1-0) || Williams (3-7) || || 33,755 || 79-55
|- bgcolor="#bbbfffbbb;"
| 135 || September 6 || Phillies || 4–3 || Reardon (2-0) || Hartley (5-6) || || 42,097 || 80-55
|- bgcolor="#bbbfffbbb;"
| 136 || September 7 || Dodgers || 7–1 || Smoltz (15-10) || Astacio (2-3) || || 40,322 || 81-55
|- bgcolor="#bbbfffbbb;"
| 137 || September 8 || Dodgers || 7–5 || Freeman (6-4) || Crews (0-2) || Reardon (3) || 36,970 || 82-55
|- bgcolor="#bbbfffbbb;"
| 138 || September 9 || Reds || 12–7 || Glavine (20-6) || Belcher (11-14) || || 41,809 || 83-55
|- bgcolor="#bbbfffbbb;"
| 139 || September 10 || Reds || 3–2 || Stanton (3-4) || Bankhead (9-4) || || 41,265 || 84-55
|- bgcolor="#bbbfffbbb;"
| 140 || September 11 || @ Astros || 7–0 || P. Smith (5-0) || Kile (3-10) || || 13,554 || 85-55
|- bgcolor="#bbbfffbbb;"
| 141 || September 12 || @ Astros || 9–3 || Nied (2-0) || Williams (7-6) || || 18,313 || 86-55
|- bgcolor="#bbbfffbbb;"
| 142 || September 13 || @ Astros || 9–2 || Leibrandt (12-6) || Harnisch (7-10) || || 14,239 || 87-55
|- bgcolor="#fffbbbbbb;"
| 143 || September 15 || @ Reds || 2–4 || Belcher (12-14) || Avery (10-10) || Dibble (20) || 22,583 || 87-56
|- bgcolor="#bbbfffbbb;"
| 144 || September 16 || @ Reds || 3–2 || Stanton (4-4) || Ruskin (4-2) || Wohlers (4) || 22,595 || 88-56
|- bgcolor="#fffbbbbbb;"
| 145 || September 17 || @ Reds || 2–3 || Rijo (13-9) || Smoltz (15-11) || Foster (1) || 24,402 || 88-57
|- bgcolor="#fffbbbbbb;"
| 146 || September 18 || Astros || 3–13 || Harnisch (8-10) || Leibrandt (12-7) || || 41,677 || 88-58
|- bgcolor="#fffbbbbbb;"
| 147 || September 19 || Astros || 2–3 (12) || D. Jones (10-8) || Freeman (6-5) || || 41,945 || 88-59
|- bgcolor="#bbbfffbbb;"
| 148 || September 20 || Astros || 16–1 || Avery (11-10) || Bowen (0-6) || || 40,493 || 89-59
|- bgcolor="#bbbfffbbb;"
| 149 || September 21 || @ Dodgers || 4–2 || P. Smith (6-0) || Hershiser (10-14) || Stanton (8) || 19,822 || 90-59
|- bgcolor="#fffbbbbbb;"
| 150 || September 22 || @ Dodgers || 1–4 || Candiotti (11-14) || Smoltz (15-12) || || 21,122 || 90-60
|- bgcolor="#bbbfffbbb;"
| 151 || September 23 || @ Giants || 7–0 || Leibrandt (13-7) || Black (10-11) || || 13,035 || 91-60
|- bgcolor="#fffbbbbbb;"
| 152 || September 24 || @ Giants || 0–4 || Brantley (6-7) || Glavine (20-7) || || 12,573 || 91-61
|- bgcolor="#fffbbbbbb;"
| 153 || September 25 || @ Padres || 0–1 || Harris (3-8) || Avery (11-11) || Myers (37) || 38,866 || 91-62
|- bgcolor="#bbbfffbbb;"
| 154 || September 26 || @ Padres || 2–1 (10) || Stanton (5-4) || Rodriguez (6-3) || || 24,574 || 92-62
|- bgcolor="#bbbfffbbb;"
| 155 || September 27 || @ Padres || 2–1 (10) || Reardon (3-0) || Myers (2-5) || || 16,884 || 93-62
|- bgcolor="#bbbfffbbb;"
| 156 || September 29 || Giants || 6–0 || Leibrandt (14-7) || Black (10-12) || || 40,860 || 94-62
|- bgcolor="#fffbbbbbb;"
| 157 || September 30 || Giants || 0–1 || Brantley (7-7) || Glavine (20-8) || Beck (16) || 38,096 || 94-63
|-

|- bgcolor="#bbbfffbbb;"
| 158 || October 1 || Giants || 6–5 (10) || Freeman (7-5) || Jackson (6-6) || || 37,359 || 95-63
|- bgcolor="#bbbfffbbb;"
| 159 || October 2 || Padres || 4–1 || Nied (3-0) || Benes (13-14) || || -- || 96-63
|- bgcolor="#bbbfffbbb;"
| 160 || October 2 || Padres || 7–2 || P. Smith (7-0) || Deshaies (4-7) || || 41,075 || 97-63
|- bgcolor="#bbbfffbbb;"
| 161 || October 3 || Padres || 1–0 (6) || Leibrandt (15-7) || Maddux (2-2) || Reynoso (1) || 26,393 || 98-63
|- bgcolor="#fffbbbbbb;"
| 162 || October 4 || Padres || 3–4 (12) || Myers (3-6) || Borbón (0-1) || || 31,791 || 98-64
|-

|- bgcolor="#bbbfffbbb;"
| 1 || October 6 || Pirates || 5–1 || Smoltz (1-0) || Drabek (0-1) || || 51,971 || 1-0
|- bgcolor="#bbbfffbbb;"
| 2 || October 7 || Pirates || 13–5 || Avery (1-0) || Jackson (0-1) || || 51,975 || 2-0
|- bgcolor="#fffbbbbbb;"
| 3 || October 9 || @ Pirates || 2–3 || Wakefield (1-0) || Glavine (0-1) || || 56,610 || 2-1
|- bgcolor="#bbbfffbbb;"
| 4 || October 10 || @ Pirates || 6–4 || Smoltz (2-0) || Drabek (0-2) || Reardon (1) || 57,164 || 3-1
|- bgcolor="#fffbbbbbb;"
| 5 || October 11 || @ Pirates || 1–7 || Walk (1-0) || Avery (1-1) || || 52,929 || 3-2
|- bgcolor="#fffbbbbbb;"
| 6 || October 13 || Pirates || 4–13 || Wakefield (2-0) || Glavine (0-2) || || 51,975 || 3-3
|- bgcolor="#bbbfffbbb;"
| 7 || October 14 || Pirates || 3–2 || Reardon (1-0) || Drabek (0-3) || || 51,975 || 4-3 
|-

|- bgcolor="#bbbfffbbb;"
| 1 || October 17 || Blue Jays || 3–1 || Glavine (1-2) || Morris (0-2) || || 51,763 || 1-0
|- bgcolor="#fffbbbbbb;"
| 2 || October 18 || Blue Jays || 4–5 || Ward (2-0) || Reardon (1-1) || Henke (4) || 51,763 || 1-1
|- bgcolor="#fffbbbbbb;"
| 3 || October 20 || @ Blue Jays || 2–3 || Ward (3-0) || Avery (1-2) || || 51,813 || 1-2
|- bgcolor="#fffbbbbbb;"
| 4 || October 21 || @ Blue Jays || 1–2 || Key (1-0) || Glavine (1-3) || Henke (5) || 52,090 || 1-3
|- bgcolor="#bbbfffbbb;"
| 5 || October 22 || @ Blue Jays || 7–2 || Smoltz (3-0) || Morris (0-3) || Stanton (1) || 52,268 || 2-3
|- bgcolor="#fffbbbbbb;"
| 6 || October 24 || Blue Jays || 3–4 (11) || Key (2-0) || Leibrandt (0-1) || Timlin (1) || 51,763 || 2-4
|-

Player stats

Batting

Starters by position
Note: Pos = Position; G = Games played; AB = At bats; H = Hits; Avg. = Batting average; HR = Home runs; RBI = Runs batted in

Other batters
Note: G = Games played; AB = At bats; H = Hits; Avg. = Batting average; HR = Home runs; RBI = Runs batted in

Pitching

Starting pitchers
Note: G = Games pitched; IP = Innings pitched; W = Wins; L = Losses; ERA = Earned run average; SO = Strikeouts

Other pitchers
Note: G = Games pitched; IP = Innings pitched; W = Wins; L = Losses; ERA = Earned run average; SO = Strikeouts

Relief pitchers
Note: G = Games pitched; W = Wins; L = Losses; SV = Saves; ERA = Earned run average; SO = Strikeouts

Postseason

National League Championship Series

Game 1
October 6: Atlanta–Fulton County Stadium, Atlanta

Game 2
October 7: Atlanta–Fulton County Stadium, Atlanta

Game 3
October 9: Three Rivers Stadium, Pittsburgh, Pennsylvania

Game 4
October 10: Three Rivers Stadium, Pittsburgh, Pennsylvania

Game 5
October 11: Three Rivers Stadium, Pittsburgh, Pennsylvania

Game 6
October 13: Atlanta–Fulton County Stadium, Atlanta

Game 7
October 14: Atlanta–Fulton County Stadium, Atlanta

World Series

Game 1
October 17, 1992, at Atlanta–Fulton County Stadium in Atlanta

Game 2
October 18, 1992, at Atlanta–Fulton County Stadium in Atlanta

Game 3
October 20, 1992, at SkyDome in Toronto, Ontario

Game 4
October 21, 1992, at SkyDome in Toronto, Ontario

Game 5
October 22, 1992, at SkyDome in Toronto, Ontario

Game 6
October 24, 1992, at Atlanta–Fulton County Stadium in Atlanta

Awards and honors 
 Tom Glavine, P – Pitcher of the Month, July
 Terry Pendleton, 3B, Gold Glove
 John Smoltz, P – NLCS MVP

All-Stars 
1992 Major League Baseball All-Star Game
 Tom Glavine – starter, pitcher
 Terry Pendleton – starter, third base
 Ron Gant – reserve

Farm system

LEAGUE CHAMPIONS: Greenville

References

 1992 Atlanta Braves at Baseball Reference
1992 Atlanta Braves at Baseball Almanac

National League champion seasons
Atlanta Braves seasons
Atlanta Braves season
National League West champion seasons
Atlanta Braves